Atenango del Río is one of the 81 municipalities of Guerrero, in south-western Mexico. The municipal seat lies at Atenango del Río. The municipality covers an area of 398.8 km².

As of 2005, the municipality had a total population of 7,648.

Municipal presidents

References

Municipalities of Guerrero